Royalties (stylized as ROYALTiES) is a musical comedy series created by, executive produced by and starring Darren Criss on Quibi. Matt and Nick Lang co-write and executive produce the series. They previously collaborated with Criss in the musical theatre company StarKid Productions. The series premiered on June 1, 2020.

Cast and characters

Main

 Darren Criss as Pierce
 Kether Donohue as Sara
 Tony Revolori as Theo
 Georgia King as Kendra

Recurring

 John Stamos as Elliot Peck
 Jackie Tohn as Polly Amorous
 Sabrina Carpenter as Bailey Rouge
 Jennifer Coolidge as Miriam Hale

Special guest appearances 

 Rufus Wainwright as Jacob Jewel
 Lil Rel Howery as Dwayne D
 Bonnie McKee as Kimmy Kelly
 Mark Hamill as Philip Combs
 Jordan Fisher as Kissgo Muah
 Julianne Hough as Gabriella Lamboni

Episodes

See also
 List of original programs distributed by Quibi
 Royalties (soundtrack)

References

External links

2020s American musical comedy television series
2020 American television series debuts
Quibi original programming